Castle Rock is a 4,321-foot (1,317 meter) elevation sandstone summit located in Glen Canyon National Recreation Area, in Kane County of southern Utah. Castle Rock towers over 600 feet above Lake Powell, and becomes an island when the lake is full. This iconic landmark of the Lake Powell area is composed primarily of Entrada Sandstone. This sandstone, which was originally deposited as sandy mud on a tidal flat, is believed to have formed about 160 million years ago during the Jurassic period as a giant sand sea, the largest in Earth's history.

Climate

According to the Köppen climate classification system, Castle Rock is located in an arid climate zone with hot, very dry summers, and chilly winters with very little snow. Spring and fall are the most favorable seasons to visit.
<div style="width:100%;"> These data are for the Wahweap climate station on Lake Powell, two miles southwest of Castle Rock.

Gallery

See also
 Colorado Plateau
 List of rock formations in the United States

References

External links
 National Weather Service forecast: Castle Rock

Colorado Plateau
Landforms of Kane County, Utah
Glen Canyon National Recreation Area
Lake Powell
North American 1000 m summits
Sandstone formations of the United States